The Villiers Diamond is a 1938 British crime film directed by Bernard Mainwaring and starring Edward Ashley, Evelyn Ankers and Frank Birch. The screenplay concerns a man who is threatened with scandal when he accidentally acquires a stolen diamond.

Cast
 Edward Ashley as Captain Dawson
 Evelyn Ankers as Joan Raymond
 Frank Birch as Silas Wade
 Liam Gaffney as Alan O'Connel
 Leslie Harcourt as Henry Barker
 Julie Suedo as Mrs Forbes
 Sybil Brooke as Miss Waring
 Bill Shine as Joe
 Margaret Davidge as Mrs. Benson
 Anita Sharp-Bolster as Mlle. Dulac

Critical reception
TV Guide dismissed it as "A vapid crime story."

References

External links

1938 films
1938 crime films
Films directed by Bernard Mainwaring
20th Century Fox films
British black-and-white films
British crime films
1930s English-language films
1930s British films